Virginia elected its members in April 1829 after the term began but before Congress convened.

See also 
 1829 Virginia's 10th congressional district special election
 1828 and 1829 United States House of Representatives elections
 List of United States representatives from Virginia

1829
Virginia
United States House of Representatives